Edevaldo de Freitas (born 28 January 1958), known as Edevaldo, is a former Brazilian footballer who played as a right-back.

During his career (1979–1998), he played for several clubs including Fluminense, Internacional, Vasco da Gama, Botafogo and in Portugal with FC Porto.

He won one Rio de Janeiro State League in 1980 and one João Gamper Trophy in Spain, 1982.  For the Brazil national football team he got 18 international caps, from October 1980 to July 1982, scored one goal against Argentina in the 1980 Mundialito. He also played for Brazil at the 1982 FIFA World Cup finals. With the FC Porto, he won the 1985–86 Portuguese championship.

References

External links
 
 

1958 births
Living people
People from Campos dos Goytacazes
Brazilian footballers
Brazilian expatriate footballers
Association football defenders
Campeonato Brasileiro Série A players
Primeira Liga players
Brazil international footballers
Brazil under-20 international footballers
1982 FIFA World Cup players
Expatriate footballers in Portugal
Brazilian expatriate sportspeople in Portugal
Fluminense FC players
Sport Club Internacional players
FC Porto players
Botafogo Futebol Clube (SP) players
Clube Náutico Capibaribe players
Bangu Atlético Clube players
Vila Nova Futebol Clube players
America Football Club (RJ) players
Associação Atlética Portuguesa (RJ) players
Mesquita Futebol Clube managers
Brazil youth international footballers
Brazilian football managers
Sportspeople from Rio de Janeiro (state)